Judges who have served on the Supreme Court of NSW  include :
Current judges
Chief Justices of NSW
Presidents of the NSW Court of Appeal
 Chief Judges in Equity
 Chief Judges in Common law
 Judges of Appeal
 Acting judges 
 Masters / Associate judges 

It does not include Judge Advocates of NSW who sat on the Court of Civil Jurisdiction between 1788 and 1814 nor judges of the Supreme Court of Civil Judicature of NSW between 1814 and 1823.

Notes

References

 
New South Wales
New South Wales-related lists